Rodrigo Ríos Lozano (born 6 June 1990), commonly known as Rodri, is a Spanish professional footballer who plays as a forward for AD Ceuta FC.

Club career

Early years
Born in Soria, Castile and León, Rodri grew up in Dos Hermanas, Province of Seville, where he was discovered by Sevilla FC scouts, thus entering the Andalusians' youth ranks. In 2009, he helped the Juvenil side win the Copa del Rey in the category after defeating Athletic Bilbao 3–2 in extra time, with two goals from the player.

Sevilla
Rodri played the vast majority of his first year as a senior with Sevilla Atlético, in the Segunda División B. He was first called to the first team for the 2009–10 UEFA Champions League round-of-16 tie against PFC CSKA Moscow, but did not leave the bench. Eventually, on 28 February 2010, he made his debut for the main squad – in La Liga – playing three minutes in a 0–0 home draw with Athletic Bilbao after having replaced Renato; Manolo Jiménez was the club's manager.

Rodri's second game came almost three months later, in the last round of the season, playing the last ten minutes at UD Almería: in the 93rd minute, Frédéric Kanouté passed to Jesús Navas, who crossed the ball to the box. After a failed attempt by Sébastien Squillaci, the youngster scored the 3–2 winner through a bicycle kick. With this victory, Sevilla edged RCD Mallorca for the fourth place, thus returning to the UEFA Champions League; the player's performance was subsequently praised in the local press.

Barcelona
Rodri was acquired by FC Barcelona Atlètic on 16 August 2011, signing a four-year contract. He made his official debut 11 days later, playing the full 90 minutes in a 2–0 home loss against Villarreal CF B in the Segunda División.

Rodri was loaned to Sheffield Wednesday for 2012–13, with an option to make the move permanent at the end of the campaign. He netted in his official debut, a 3–2 home win over Birmingham City in the Football League Championship.

On 31 January 2013, Rodri returned to Barcelona, being immediately loaned to Real Zaragoza for the rest of the season and with the Aragonese having the option to extend a further year. He scored the first of his two league goals on 30 March, opening the 1–1 home draw with Real Madrid, but his team eventually suffered relegation as last.

Rodri joined fellow league side Almería in a season-long loan on 11 July 2013. He made his debut for them on 19 August, starting and scoring twice but in a 3–2 home loss to Villarreal CF, then proceeded to net five more times in the following 12 matches, including the game's only against Real Valladolid and CA Osasuna.

On 28 November 2013, Rodri suffered an injury in his right ankle, returning to the squad weeks later. However, on 11 December he suffered a sprain in his left ankle, being again sidelined until 22 February of the following year when he played the last 19 minutes of a 0–0 home draw against Málaga CF.

1860 Munich
Late in August 2014, Rodri joined German club TSV 1860 Munich, signing a contract until 2017. He made his 2. Bundesliga debut on 20 September, replacing compatriot Edu Bedia at the hour mark of a 1–1 home draw against FC Ingolstadt 04.

Rodri scored his first goal on 20 March 2015, after an assist by Korbinian Vollmann in a 1–1 draw with VfR Aalen also at the Allianz Arena. On 4 August, he was loaned to Real Valladolid of the Spanish second tier in a season-long deal.

Later career
On 27 July 2016, shortly after cutting ties with TSV by mutual consent, Rodri returned to his homeland and penned a one-year contract with Córdoba CF. He continued competing in the second division in the following seasons, with Cultural y Deportiva Leonesa and Granada CF.

On 16 October 2019, free agent Rodri signed a short-term deal with Bristol City lasting until January 2020, with the option of an extension until 30 June. He returned to his homeland shortly after, joining second-tier Real Oviedo for six months.

International career
Just two days after making his debut with Sevilla's first team, Rodri played for the first time with the Spanish under-21s.

Career statistics

Honours
Sevilla
Copa del Rey: 2009–10

References

External links

1990 births
Living people
People from Soria
Sportspeople from the Province of Soria
Spanish footballers
Footballers from Castile and León
Association football forwards
La Liga players
Segunda División players
Segunda División B players
Primera Federación players
Sevilla Atlético players
Sevilla FC players
FC Barcelona Atlètic players
Real Zaragoza players
UD Almería players
Real Valladolid players
Córdoba CF players
Cultural Leonesa footballers
Granada CF footballers
Real Oviedo players
UD Logroñés players
AD Ceuta FC players
English Football League players
Sheffield Wednesday F.C. players
Bristol City F.C. players
2. Bundesliga players
TSV 1860 Munich players
Spain under-21 international footballers
Spanish expatriate footballers
Expatriate footballers in England
Expatriate footballers in Germany
Spanish expatriate sportspeople in England
Spanish expatriate sportspeople in Germany